Mademühlen is a village in the municipality of Driedorf in the Westerwald hill region in Lahn-Dill-Kreis in the German state of Hesse.

Location 
Mademühlen lies within the protected area of Hessian Westerwald  (Hessischer Westerwald) and within the European network of such areas, Natura 2000.

The village is on the upper reaches of the Rehbach stream, between two reservoirs and owes its name to a number of mills which were established over the centuries on the upper course of the Rehbach. Around 1800 it was described as a rich farming village. A typical Westerwald farmhouse from Mademühlen is display in the Hessenpark Open Air Museum.

References

External links 

 Mademühlen at the Driedorf website
 
 

Lahn-Dill-Kreis
Natura 2000 in Germany